Greg Lewis may refer to:
Greg Lewis (sprinter) (born 1946), Australian athlete
Greg Lewis (basketball) (born 1978), American professional basketball player
Greg Lewis (running back) (born 1969), American football player 
Greg Lewis (wide receiver) (born 1980), American football wide receiver
Greg Lewis (politician) (1953–2020), member of the Kansas House of Representatives
Greg Lewis (sportscaster) (born 1947), American sportscaster